The Nelson River is located in the administrative region of Capitale-Nationale, in province of Quebec, in Canada. It is part of the watershed of the Saint-Charles River. The course of this river crosses:
 the La Jacques-Cartier Regional County Municipality: the municipality of Saint-Gabriel-de-Valcartier;
 the Quebec city: sector La Haute-Saint-Charles and Neufchâtel-Nord area.

The Nelson River Valley is mainly served by Nelson River Street, Valcartier Boulevard, Rue du Petit Vallon, Route de la Bravoure and Route Cathcart.

The surface of the Saint-Charles River (except the rapids areas) is generally frozen from the beginning of December to the end of March; however, safe circulation on the ice is generally done from the end of December to the beginning of March. The water level of the river varies with the seasons and the precipitation; the spring flood occurs in March or April.

Geography 
The Nelson River sub-basin occupies the western part of the watershed of the Saint-Charles River and straddles part of the Quebec city and the municipality of Saint-Gabriel-de-Valcartier. Formerly also called by its residents "Grand-Désert river", it rises near the Canadian Forces Base of Valcartier (a garrison of the Canadian Armed Forces), runs through the Val-Bélair district then flows into the Saint-Charles River a little upstream of the drinking water supply point of the Quebec city, at the level of rue Jeanne-D'Arc on the territory of 7th arrondissement.

The watershed is characterized by an average altitude that varies little from upstream to downstream. The relief is however punctuated by a few mountains at the higher altitude (Mount of the Three Augustines, Mount Brillant and Mount Rolland-J.-Auger) on which certain recreational activities are sometimes practiced, notably in the territory of the Canadian Forces Base of Valcartier where a ski center has been set up.

The land use in the Nelson River sub-basin is predominantly forest. However, two sectors are marked by agricultural activities, mainly poultry farming and cereal farming. With many meanders in wooded then semi-urban territory, we meet a diverse fauna despite the pollution inherent in the territories it crosses in its last kilometers (trout, mallards), amphibians, etc.).

  to the south, first forming a large curve to the west and crossing a small unidentified lake to its mouth. Note: This lake hosts the outlet of a stream (coming from the northwest);
  south-east, to the outlet (coming from the north) of Lac Blanc;
  south-east, to the confluence of La Petite Rivière;
Note: This end of segment corresponds to the limit between Saint-Gabriel-de-Valcartier and La Haute-Saint-Charles;
  to the east, meandering through the Val-Saint-Michel district, and collecting the Savard stream (coming from the west), to route 573;
  towards the east, then the northeast by snaking to its mouth.

From this confluence, the current descends on  generally towards the south-east, then towards the north-east, following the course of the Saint-Charles river.

Toponymy 
A street in Quebec is called "rue de la Rivière-Nelson" in arrondissement of La Haute-Saint-Charles.

The term "Nelson" evokes the life work of Neilson McBain (Quebec, 1898 - Quebec, 1985), mayor of Saint-Gabriel-de-Valcartier in 1949 and owner of land crossed by the Nelson river. The writing of the name of the river differs slightly from that of the character from which it takes its name. This river was once called Mill River. This name appears on the act of acquisition of the property in 1925. In 1963, the river was already known by its current name.

The toponym "Nelson River" was formalized on March 28, 1974 at the Commission de toponymie du Québec.

Sources 
 Vescovi, L. (1998) Modern thinking on urban water management: hydro-bio-chemical modeling of the Saint-Charles river basin. Quebec: INRS-Eau (Doctoral thesis); extract consulted via Rivière vivante, June 15, 2006.
 Brodeur, C., F. Lewis, E. Huet-Alegre, Y. Ksouri, M.-C. Leclerc and D. Viens. 2007. Portrait of the Saint-Charles river basin. Saint-Charles river basin council. 216 p + 9 annexes 217-340 pp

Notes and references

External link 
 The Nelson River on Google Maps

See also 

 La Jacques-Cartier Regional County Municipality
 Quebec (city), a city
 Saint-Gabriel-de-Valcartier, a municipality
 La Haute-Saint-Charles, a sector of Quebec city
 CFB Valcartier, Canadian Forces Base Valcartier
 La Petite Rivière, a tributary
 Saint-Charles River
 St. Lawrence River
 List of rivers of Quebec

Nelson